The Dinwoody Formation is a geologic formation in Montana. It preserves fossils dating back to the Triassic period.

See also

 List of fossiliferous stratigraphic units in Montana
 Paleontology in Montana

References
 

Triassic geology of Nevada
Triassic geology of Utah
Triassic geology of Wyoming